The Auati-Paraná Canal is a natural canal of Amazonas state in north-western Brazil.
It is a distributary that leaves the Solimões River and joins the Japurá River.

Course

The Auati-Paraná, also called the Ati-Paraná or Ati-Paranã, is sometimes called a river, sometimes a paraná (channel) and sometimes a canal. The last term seems most appropriate, since the natural canal leaves one river and joins another.
The canal divides the lower western Amazon plateau to the north from the Amazon plain.
The canal forms the boundary between the  Auatí-Paraná Extractive Reserve, created in 2001, on the north bank, and the Mamirauá Sustainable Development Reserve on the south bank.
The canal is a body of white water, but almost all the streams that flow into it from the extractive reserve are black water.

See also
List of rivers of Amazonas

References

Sources

Rivers of Amazonas (Brazilian state)